This is a list of universities and colleges in Israel. As of August 2021, there are ten universities and 53 colleges in Israel, which are recognized and academically supervised by the Council for Higher Education in Israel. In addition, Israel founded a university in Ariel in the West Bank, which used to be academically supervised by the Council for Higher Education in Judea and Samaria. As many course offerings are varied, Israeli universities are considered to be of top quality, and they are inexpensive to attend. Israel's quality university education is largely responsible for spurring the country's high tech boom and rapid economic development.

The primary difference between a university and a college in Israel is that only a university can confer doctorate degrees, and therefore tends to be more research-oriented than the more teaching-oriented colleges.

Universities
Israel's universities are listed below, followed by their English acronym, establishment date, location, latest data about the number of students and the institute's academic rank of the top world universities, according to WebOMetrics (top 3000), Shanghai Jiao Tong University (SJTU) (top 500) and The Times Higher Education Supplement (THES) (top 200):

Most universities offer the full range of graduate and undergraduate degrees: Bachelor's degrees, Master's degrees, and doctorates. However, the Weizmann Institute does not grant bachelor's degrees.

Colleges

Other institutes of higher education that are accredited by CHEI to confer a bachelor's (and in some cases a master's) degree are known as colleges ( Mikhlala; pl.   Mikhlalot). There are also over twenty teacher training colleges - most of which will award only the Bachelor of Education (B.Ed.).

1Located in the Israeli occupied territories

Non-degree post-secondary education schools
The Ministry of Education has also certified certain institutions to award Professional Certificates instead of academic degrees.  These include certificates in technology and in the performing arts.

Beersheba Tehni School combines secondary military preparation with post-secondary practical engineer certification to qualify technicians for service in the Israel Air Force
Beit Zvi School of the Performing Arts, Ramat Gan
Maaleh School of Film and Television, Jerusalem 
Sam Spiegel Film and Television School, Jerusalem

Non-Israeli certified Colleges
Several colleges – primarily religious institutions – operate in Israel that are not certified by the CHEI, but rather are accredited by international bodies outside of Israel.

Bethlehem Bible College includes a campus within Israel at Nazareth, as well as two campuses in the Palestinian Authority at Bethlehem and Gaza, accredited by Asia Theological Association and Middle East Association of Theological Education

Israel College of the Bible, Netanya
Jerusalem University College
Nazareth Evangelical College
One for Israel Bible College a/k/a Israel College of the Bible (ICB) accredited by Asia Theological Association, European Council for Theological Education
Reidman College, Tel Aviv, Jerusalem, Haifa, Beersheba, Eilat, Kinneret, and Misgav, offers alternative medicine certificates not recognized by the Ministry of Education, and offers a BA degree in Chinese Medicine through Zhejiang Chinese Medical University

Foreign university campuses
The following foreign colleges and universities maintain international branch campuses in Israel:

Brigham Young University – the BYU Jerusalem Center
Hebrew Union College-Jewish Institute of Religion
Hillsong College, in conjunction with Hillsong Church Israel 
NYU
Touro College offers courses in Jerusalem, but a degree must be completed in New York
University of Indianapolis
Yeshiva University

Of note, the prestigious NYU, which enrolls the largest number of Jewish students of any public or private university in the United States, and is ranked in the top 34 globally in all major publications of university rankings, has a campus in Tel Aviv.

See also
Education in Israel
Mechina

References

External links

The Council for Higher Education in Israel
Study in Israel

Universities and colleges

Israel
Israel